Winter Garden is a city  west of Downtown Orlando in the western part of Orange County, Florida, United States. It is part of the Orlando–Kissimmee–Sanford, Florida Metropolitan Statistical Area. Its population was 46,964 as of 2020.

History

Early Native History
The pre-European history of the modern Winter Garden area is ambiguous. Due to a lack of evidence, historians hesitate to conclude if the natives that once occupied the area were of the Timucua, Jororo, or Mayaca tribes. Regardless of their tribal identity, these natives were either wiped out or subsumed into larger cultures by the end of the eighteenth century.

Seminole Peoples and War

Following the eradication of the original Floridian cultures, natives from farther north migrated into Florida. These natives had various cultures that over time coalesced into the Seminole Tribe. By the early 19th century, some Seminole lived on the south shore of Lake Apopka. The settlement possibly produced the significant Seminole leader Wild Cat. In 1835, the Second Seminole War began, threatening the Seminole presence. On January 23, 1837, a small battle was fought near the village. Thomas S. Jesup, at that time in command of all American forces in Florida, sent a detachment to Lake Apopka to seek a Seminole chief known as Osuchee or "Copper." During the attack, the army successfully killed Osuchee and three other Seminoles, while taking 17 prisoners. The Second and Third Seminole wars both pushed the Seminole tribe south, likely eliminating their presence in the boundaries of modern Winter Garden.

American Settlers

The first American settlers came to what is now Winter Garden in the 1850s. The Roper, Reams, Dunaway, Speer, and Starke families were among the first to settle the area. As with most American pioneers, they engaged in agriculture as a primary economic activity. These farms mainly grew sugar cane and vegetables, and early on a small number utilized slave labor. During The Civil War steamboat traffic stopped along the St. Johns River, forcing Winter Garden families to subsist off their own crops. 

The arrival of the Orange Belt Railroad and the growing production of citrus, turpentine, and lumber drove the town's growth over the remaining decades of the 19th century and into the 20th. Stores and businesses cropped up along Plant Street, originating Downtown Winter Garden. A settler from Mississippi named A. B. Newton greatly contributed to the town's growth. He opened one of the first stores, served as the first postmaster, founded the first newspaper, and functioned as the first mayor. These endeavors earned him the title "The Godfather of Winter Garden."

Fishing

Between the 1920s and 1960s, the fishing prospects of Lake Apopka drew many fishermen to Winter Garden. The still-operating Edgewater Hotel in Downtown Winter Garden opened to service fishermen during the fishing boom. However, by the end of the 1960s, heavy pollution of Lake Apopka resulted in the collapse of the industry.

Citrus

Citrus agriculture saw rapid growth in the state of Florida in the last few decades of the 19th century, including in Winter Garden. As with the rest of the state, the Great Freeze of 1894–1895 severely damaged the citrus industry in Winter Garden. Many settlers left town following this disaster, leaving a smaller population to recover the area's farms. Despite this setback, the industry recovered and saw many decades of growth. Through the middle stretch of the 20th century citrus defined Winter Garden's economy and culture.

In the 1980s back-to-back freezes greatly reduced the profitability of citrus farming in the county. Citrus production in Winter Garden and Orange County never recovered. Since then, the center of citrus production in Florida has shifted south from Orange County. The increasing development of the Orlando–Kissimmee–Sanford Metropolitan Area made it more profitable to sell grove lands to developers rather than attempt to restart them. Today, little citrus activity occurs in the city limits of Winter Garden. Yet, the town is proud of its citrus history; oranges and grapefruits continue to be symbols of the town.

21st century growth

Since 2000, Winter Garden has seen incredible growth despite the decline of citrus and the economic stagnation in the 1980s and 1990's. Developers, entrepreneurs, and city government made efforts to rejuvenate the downtown district, attracting locals and tourists with a mix of small town atmosphere and trendy businesses. This population and development growth endured through the Great Recession and continues today.

Geography

Winter Garden is located at  (28.560328, –81.584069).

Winter Garden is bordered on the south by the town of Windermere, on the east by the city of Ocoee, on the west by the town of Oakland and on the north by Lake Apopka.

Topography

The terrain is characterized by a gentle to moderately sloping topography. Winter Garden has the highest elevation spot in Orange County. The lowest elevation in the city is   near Lake Apopka.

Climate

Winter Garden has a warm and humid subtropical climate, and there are two major seasons each year. One of those seasons is hot and rainy, lasting from May until October (roughly coinciding with the Atlantic hurricane season). The other is a cooler season (November through March) that brings more moderate temperatures and less frequent rainfall. The area's warm and humid climate is caused primarily by its low elevation and its position relatively close to the Tropic of Cancer, and much of its weather is affected by the movement of the Gulf Stream.

Demographics

As of the 2000 United States census, there were 14,351 people, 5,380 households, and 3,663 families residing in the city. The racial makeup of the city was 76.60% White, 13.25% African American, 0.36% Native American, 0.99% Asian, 0.05% Pacific Islander, 6.45% from other races, and 2.31% from two or more races. Hispanic or Latino of any race were 17.50% of the population.

There were 5,380 households, out of which 33.2% had children under the age of 18 living with them, 48.8% were married couples living together, 14.4% had a female householder with no husband present, and 31.9% were non-families. 25.2% of all households were made up of individuals, and 9.7% had someone living alone who was 65 years of age or older.  The average household size was 2.60 and the average family size was 3.11.

In the city the population was spread out, with 25.9% under the age of 18, 9.0% from 18 to 24, 31.3% from 25 to 44, 19.5% from 45 to 64, and 14.2% who were 65 years of age or older.  The median age was 37.1 years. For every 100 females, there were 91.9 males.  For every 100 females age 18 and over, there were 88.8 males.

The median income for a household in the city was $41,858. About 10.1% of families and 12.0% of the population were below the poverty line, including 19.7% of those under age 18 and 9.4% of those age 65 or over.

Neighborhoods

 Alexander Ridge Manors
 Amberleigh
 Avalon Reserve
 Bay Isle at Black Lake
 Belle Meade
 Black Lake Park
 Bradford Creek
 Brandy Creek
 Bronsons Landing
 Cambridge Crossing
 Carriage Pointe
 Chapin Station
 Cobblestone
 Courtlea Oaks
 Courtlea Park
 Covington Chase
 Crown Point Springs
 Deer Island
 Daniels Crossing
 Daniels Landing
 Deerfield Place
 Emerald Ridge
 Flamingo Crossings
 Fox Crest (at Stone Crest)
 Fullers Crossing
 Fullers Landing
 Glenview Estates
 Glynwood (at Stone Crest)
 Grovehurst
 Grove Park (at Stone Crest)
 Hamilton Gardens
 Hamlin
 The Harbor
 Hickory Hammock on Johns Lake
 Horizon Oaks
 Hyde Park
 Inland Seas
 Island Pointe
 Johns Lake Pointe
 King's Bay
 Lake Cove Pointe
 Lake Roberts Landing
 Lakes Of Windermere
 Lakeview Reserve
 Lakeshore Preserve
 Latham Park
 Magnolia Woods
 McAllister Landing
 Oakglen Estates
 Oak Park
 Oaks at Brandy Lake
 Oakland Park
 Orange Cove
 Independence
 The Orchard
 Park Avenue Estates
 Park Place at Winter Garden
 Regal Pointe
 Regency Oaks (at Stone Crest)
 The Reserve at Carriage Point
 Southern Pines
 Sterling Pointe
 Stone Creek
 Stone Crest
 Stoneybrook West
 Summerlake
 Teacup Springs
 Timbercreek Pines
 Traditions
 Trailer City
 Trails of Winter Garden
 Tucker Oaks
 Tuscany
 Valencia Shores
 Village Grove
 Watermark
 Westbrook Townhomes
 Westfield Lakes
 Westside Townhomes
 Windermere Crossing
 Windtree Garden Condos
 Winter Oaks
 Wintermere Harbor
 Wintermere Pointe
 Winward Cay

Arts and culture

Points of interest 
 
 
 Central Florida Railroad Museum
 Garden Theatre
 Luther F. Tilden House 
 West Orange Trail 
 Winter Garden Downtown Historic District 
 Winter Garden Heritage Museum
 Winter Garden Historic Residential District

Shopping
Historic downtown Winter Garden contains a collection of restaurants, shops, and cafés, as well as two museums and a performing arts venue.

To the south, Winter Garden Village provides an array of chain retail and dining establishments.  The  open-air shopping center, located along Daniels Road just north of SR 429, is anchored by a Super Target, a Best Buy, Sprint and a Lowe's.

Downtown Winter Garden hosts a farmer's market every weekend. Many vendors sell fresh produce, plants, and flowers, herbs, baked goods, artisan crafts, and local food and beverages. Live music is also a key feature of the market.

Infrastructure

Transportation

State Road 50 (W. Colonial Dr) bisects the city into northern and southern sections. The portion south of State Road 50, formerly occupied by orange groves and farmland, has recently been the site of the development of numerous large-scale communities, including Johns Lake Pointe, Stoneybrook West, Stonecrest, Westfield, and Wintermere Pointe.

The toll road Western Beltway (SR 429) was completed in late 2006 and links I-4 near mile marker 58 in Osceola County with Florida's Turnpike at Winter Garden. Other major roads through Winter Garden include County Road 535 and County Road 545.  CR 535 (also called Winter Garden – Vineland Road) begins at SR 50 and bisects the southern half of the city, proceeding south to Windermere, Lake Buena Vista and Walt Disney World Resort, where it becomes State Road 535.  CR 545 (also called Avalon Road) begins at SR 50 and proceeds south along the western edge of Winter Garden and along the border between Orange and Lake counties. This area remains mostly rural but is quickly developing because of the nearby toll road.  CR 545 currently ends at US 192 in Kissimmee at the border to Osceola County.

Notable people

 Nolan Fontana, professional baseball infielder for the Texas Rangers
 Austin Gomber, professional baseball pitcher for the St. Louis Cardinals
 Ken Griffey Jr., former professional baseball right fielder for the Seattle Mariners
 Lyoto Machida, former UFC light heavyweight champion
 George Bray McMillan, pilot with the Flying Tigers; Army Air Corps fighter pilot and World War II combat "ace"
 Adande Thorne, Trinidadian-American YouTuber and animator known for his YouTube channel sWooZie
 Luther Fuller Tilden, pioneer who settled near Winter Garden and contributed to its growth
 Dexter Williams, American football running back
 Mason Williams, professional baseball shortstop for the Cincinnati Reds

References

External links
 
 City of Winter Garden official website

 
Cities in Florida
Cities in Orange County, Florida
Greater Orlando
1908 establishments in Florida
Populated places established in 1908